The Utica Psychiatric Center, also known as Utica State Hospital, opened in Utica on January 16, 1843. It was New York's first state-run facility designed to care for the mentally ill, and one of the first such institutions in the United States. It was originally called the New York State Lunatic Asylum at Utica. The Greek Revival structure was designed by Captain William Clarke and its construction was funded by the state and by contributions from Utica residents.

"McPike Addiction Treatment Center is a 68-bed inpatient facility located in Utica, New York, on the campus of the Mohawk Valley Psychiatric Center (MVPC)."

History
The original plans for the hospital included four identical buildings, set at right angles to one another with a central courtyard. Due to a lack of funds, construction was halted after the first building was completed.

The hospital filled quickly and more beds were needed, so the building was enlarged by the addition of wings on either end. These wings opened in 1846, and in 1850, the accommodations were listed as: "380 single rooms for patients, 24 for their attendants, 20 dormitories each accommodating from 5 to 12 persons, 16 parlors or day rooms, 12 dining rooms, 24 bathing rooms, 24 closets and 24 water closets".

The hospital's first director, Amariah Brigham, believed in "labor as the most essential of our curative means". Accordingly, patients were encouraged to participate in outdoor tasks, such as gardening, and handicrafts, such as needlework and carpentry. Brigham also introduced an annual fair at the hospital to display and sell items created by the patients. The first fair, in 1844, raised $200, which went toward an addition to the library, musical instruments, and a greenhouse. Some of the asylum inmates also printed a newspaper, called The Opal, which contained articles, poems, and drawings produced by the patients. 
Another analysis, from the perspective of modern psychiatric survivors is that The Opal while seeming to give power to inmates really was just another form of slavery.  However, this analysis contradicts the editors of The Opal, who insisted their writing and publication was their work alone. In this respect, The Opal provided certain inmates with a creative outlet. 

In 1852, Old Main's first floor stairway caught fire. Patients and staff were safely evacuated, but a firefighter and doctor were killed while trying to salvage items from the building. The entire center portion of the building was destroyed. Four days after the fire at Old Main, a barn on the asylum grounds caught fire. William Spiers, a convicted arsonist, former patient, and sporadic employee, was arrested after admitting to setting both fires because he was angry with his supervisor.

American Journal of Insanity

In 1844, Brigham founded the first English-language journal devoted to the subject of mental illness, American Journal of Insanity. Brigham was the editor-in-chief, and the journal was printed in the Utica State Hospital printing shop. After Brigham's death, the journal became the property of the hospital and in 1894, the American Medico-Psychological Association bought the journal for $994.50. The journal was later renamed the American Psychiatric Journal.

Utica Crib

Brigham disliked the then-current practice of using chains to restrain patients, and invented the "Utica Crib" as an alternative. The Utica Crib was an ordinary bed with a thick mattress on the bottom, slats on the sides, and a hinged top that could be locked from the outside. Doctors used the Utica Crib to control and calm patients who were out of control. While use of the Utica Crib was widely criticized, some patients found it to have important therapeutic value. One patient who had slept in the Utica crib for several days commented that he had rested better and found it useful for "all crazy fellows as I, whose spirit is willing, but whose flesh is weak".

In the Edinburgh Medical Journal (February 1878), Dr. Lindsay and other physicians at the Murray Royal Institution at Perth recommended the Utica Crib. Lindsay stated that "the bed was practical and safe to patients." However, Dr. Hammond and Dr. Mycert of the Utica State Hospital attacked the Utica Crib. Mycert stated that "the crib is at most barbarous and unscientific because there is already a tendency to determine the blood to the brain in excited forms of insanity which is released by the horizontal position in the crib and struggles the patient." Mycert also compared the Utica Crib to a coffin.  Hammond stated that sometimes patients died from being in the Utica Crib. Some of these deaths occurred when attendants thought the patients were out of control when, in fact, they were having a heart attack, a stroke, or some other type of serious health problem. On January 18, 1887, with the help of George Alder Blumer, all Utica Cribs were removed from the Utica State Hospital.

Decline and re-use
A Secret Institution (1890), a 19th-century autobiographical narrative, describes Clarissa Caldwell Lathrop's institutionalization at the asylum for voicing suspicions that someone was trying to poison her.

In 1977, the last patients were transferred to other care facilities and the hospital was closed. It is now an unoccupied, run-down building that is being used as a records archive for the New York State Office of Mental Health. Other, more modern, buildings on the large property are in use for psychiatric and other medical care. It has been a National Historic Landmark since 1989.

Notable people
Clarissa Caldwell Lathrop
James Bailey Silkman
William H. Christian

Photos

References

External links

Utica State Psychiatric Hospital Photos Before Demolition of the Wings
Utica State Psychiatric Hospital Photos During Demolition of the Wings
Cribs, Cages, and Baskets

Psychiatric hospitals in New York (state)
National Historic Landmarks in New York (state)
Psychiatric Center
Government buildings completed in 1843
Hospital buildings completed in 1843
Greek Revival architecture in New York (state)
Buildings and structures in Oneida County, New York
1843 establishments in New York (state)
New York State Department of Mental Hygiene